Zalman Nechemia Goldberg (January 28, 1931 – August 20, 2020) was a rabbi, posek, and rosh yeshiva in Israel. The scion of a Lithuanian Jewish family, Goldberg was also a son-in-law of Shlomo Zalman Auerbach.

Harav Goldberg was a halakhic authority and Chief Justice of the Rabbinical High Court in Jerusalem, where he made rulings on the issues of gittin, ketubot, artificial insemination, and the commandment of living in the Land of Israel. He co-authored the Jewish prenuptial agreement sponsored by the Rabbinical Council of America together with Mordechai Willig.
 
Harav Goldberg was the rosh yeshiva of both the Sadigura Hasidic yeshiva and the Jerusalem College of Technology (Machon Lev), and headed the Institute for the Higher Study of Halacha (Machon Iyun Ha'Halacha) in Jerusalem. He lectured extensively at Chabad's  Yeshivat Torat Emet of Jerusalem on matters of Jewish law.

Harav Goldberg was also well known for his semicha (rabbinic ordination) exams, which were often taken as an alternative to those offered by the Israeli Rabbinate.

Harav Goldberg became the editor and chief of Encyclopedia Talmudit in 2008.

In November 2009, he wrote an endorsement for The King's Torah, a controversial book by Yitzhak Shapira. He later rescinded it, saying that the book includes statements that "have no place in human intelligence."

Goldberg died on 20 August 2020 at Hadassah Medical Center in Ein Kerem, a week after collapsing in his home. His funeral was held at the Shamgar Funeral house and Mount of Olives cemetery.

References

External links
 Halakha Down to Earth: In Memory of Rav Z.N. Goldberg Yona Reiss, Tradition Online
 Rav Zalman Nechemia Goldberg, zt”l: A Great Gaon and a Great Human Being By Rabbi Haim Jachter | August 27, 2020, New Jersey Jewish Link
 הרב הראשי לישראל הגאון רבי דוד לאו בהספד על מורו ורבו הגרז״נ גולדברג זצ״ל by Rabbi David Lau
 הספד על הגרז"ן זצ"ל, מפי בנו, הרב אהרן גולדברג by his son Rabbi Aharon Goldberg
 Azkara for Rav Zalman Nechemia Goldberg זצ"ל, Rabbi Mordechai Willig and Rabbi Meir Goldwicht

Haredi rabbis in Israel
Academic staff of Jerusalem College of Technology
Rabbis in Jerusalem
Israeli Rosh yeshivas
Israeli people of Lithuanian-Jewish descent
1931 births
2020 deaths